Alicia Montoya (January 25, 1920 – August 17, 2002) was a Mexican actress, the daughter of the stage actress .

Selected filmography
 Talpa (1956)
 El duende y yo (1959)
 Mujeres de Fuego (1959)
 Quinceañera (1960)
 Teresa (1961)

Telenovelas 
 Abrázame muy fuerte (2000-2001).... Gumersinda Montes
 Serafín (1999).... Cruz
 Gotita de amor (1998).... Trini
 Pueblo chico, infierno grande (1997).... Doña Hipólita
 Bendita mentira (1996).... Virtudes
 La culpa (1996).... Manuela
 Retrato de familia (1995).... Nana Candelaria
 Imperio de cristal (1995).... Antonia Arizmendi
 Valentina (1993).... Bertha
 Clarisa (1993).... Casilda
 Amor de nadie (1990).... Anna
 Victoria (1987).... Esperanza
 Quinceañera (1987).... Licha
 Herencia maldita (1986).... Catherine
 El engaño (1986).... Martha
 Ángel Guerra (1979)
 Honrarás a los tuyos (1979)
 El Enemigo (1979)
 La llama de tu amor (1979)
 Donde termina el camino (1978)
 Barata de primavera (1975).... Nana Licha
 Pobre Clara (1975).... Tía Emilia
 Los miserables (1974).... Madre Abadesa
 Entre brumas (1973).... Sarah
 Velo de novia (1971)
 Muchacha italiana viene a casarse (1971).... Teresa #2
 La constitución (1970).... Lola Jiménez y Muro
 Puente de amor (1969)
 No creo en los hombres (1969)
 Sin palabras (1969).... Elise
 Rubí I (1968).... Refugio
 Leyendas de México (1968)
 Águeda (1968)
 Chucho el Roto (1968).... Doña Luisa
 Estafa de amor (1967)
 Lo prohibido (1967)
 Deborah (1967)
 Más fuerte que tu amor (1966)
 Vértigo (1966)
 Una mujer (1965)
 La sembradora (1965)
 La mentira (1965)
 Historia de un cobarde (1964)
 El dolor de vivir (1964)
 El crisol (1964)
 La sombra del otro (1963)
 Doña Macabra (1963)
 La actriz (1962)
 La herencia (1962)
 Don Bosco (1961)
 Teresa (1959).... Mamá de Teresa
 Ha llegado un extraño (1959)
 Más allá de la angustia (1959)
 Senda prohibida (1958)

External links
 

1920 births
2002 deaths
20th-century Mexican actresses
21st-century Mexican actresses
Mexican television actresses
Mexican stage actresses
Mexican telenovela actresses
Actresses from Mexico City